Tommy Williams (12 September 1909 – 14 January 1990) was an Australian rules footballer who played for Fitzroy in the Victorian Football League (VFL).

A half-back flanker, Williams was at Fitzroy during a particularly weak period for the club where they failed to makes the finals in each season he played. The East Brunswick recruit represented the VFL in three interstate matches and later returned to Fitzroy as coach of the under-19s. On one occasion, in 1964, he filled in as coach of the seniors when Kevin Murray was unavailable.

Notes

References
Holmesby, Russell and Main, Jim (2007). The Encyclopedia of AFL Footballers. 7th ed. Melbourne: Bas Publishing.

External links
 
 

1909 births
1990 deaths
Australian rules footballers from Victoria (Australia)
Australian Rules footballers: place kick exponents
Fitzroy Football Club players
Fitzroy Football Club coaches